The 2018–19 Yale Bulldogs women's basketball team represented Yale University during the 2018–19 NCAA Division I women's basketball season. The Bulldogs, led by fourth year head coach Allison Guth, played their home games at John J. Lee Amphitheater of the Payne Whitney Gymnasium as members of the Ivy League. They finished the season at 16–13, 6–8 to finish in a 3 way tie for fourth place. Due to a tie breaker loss to Cornell and Dartmouth they failed to qualify for the Ivy League women's tournament.

Roster

Schedule

|-
!colspan=9 style=| Non-conference regular season

|-
!colspan=9 style=| Ivy League regular season

See also
 2018–19 Yale Bulldogs men's basketball team

References

Yale
Yale Bulldogs women's basketball seasons
Yale Bulldogs
Yale Bulldogs